Gerrard Street Baptist Church, located in the city of Aberdeen in Scotland, is a Baptist church affiliated with the Baptist Union of Scotland.

History
The building was opened in 1900, although a church has existed on the site since 1844.  The church, including an adjoining church hall, is a Category B listed building.

References

Baptist churches in Scotland
Category B listed buildings in Aberdeen
Listed churches in Scotland